The Dreadnought hoax was a prank pulled by Horace de Vere Cole in 1910. Cole tricked the Royal Navy into showing their flagship, the battleship HMS Dreadnought, to a fake delegation of "Abyssinian royals". The hoax drew attention in Britain to the emergence of the Bloomsbury Group, among whom some of Cole's collaborators numbered. The hoax was a repeat of a similar impersonation that Cole and Adrian Stephen had organised while they were students at Cambridge in 1905.

Background

Hoaxers

Horace de Vere Cole was born in Ireland in 1881 to a well-to-do family. He was commissioned into the Yorkshire Hussars and served in the Second Boer War, where he was seriously wounded and invalided out of service. On his return to Britain, he became an undergraduate at Trinity College, Cambridge; he studied little and spent his time entertaining and undertaking hoaxes and pranks.

One of Cole's closest friends at Trinity was Adrian Stephen, a keen sportsman and actor. Cole's biographer, Martyn Downer, considers that Stephen was a "perfect foil for ... [Cole]: someone sympathetic and encouraging yet unafraid to take him on". Stephen was the son of Leslie, the writer and critic, and Julia, the philanthropist and Pre-Raphaelite model. Adrian Stephen's elder brother, Thoby, was also at Trinity, and their sisters, Vanessa (later Vanessa Bell) and Virginia (later Virginia Woolf), would visit. After university, the four Stephen siblings became members of the Bloomsbury Group, the set of associated writers, intellectuals, philosophers, and artists, many of whose members had also been at Trinity College. Cole was on the fringes of the group but never a member.

Cambridge Zanzibar hoax

In early 1905, while in their second year at Trinity College, Cambridge, Cole and Adrian Stephen decided to use a visit to England of Sayyid Ali bin Hamud Al-Busaid, the eighth Sultan of Zanzibar as the basis for a hoax. A plan was put together to fake a state visit of the sultan to Cambridge, although they realised that as the sultan's picture had recently appeared in the press, there was a risk the visiting sultan would be shown as a fraud. They decided that Cole would impersonate the sultan's uncle rather than the sultan. On 2 March, they sent a telegram to the Mayor of Cambridge to ask if he could arrange a suitable reception for the sultan:

The students obtained robes and turbans from the theatrical costumier Willy Clarkson, applied blackface make-up and took the train from London. A carriage met the group at Cambridge railway station and took them to the guildhall, where the mayor and town clerk met them. After a brief reception, they were taken on a tour of the town, including some of the university's colleges; the hoaxers were seen by some of their friends and acquaintances who did not recognise them. After less than an hour they demanded to be returned to the station. As they did not want to return to London—returning from which would have meant them breaking the 10:00pm college curfew—on arrival at the station, they ran out of a side exit and took two hansom cabs to a friend's house, where they changed back into their normal attire.

The following day Cole gave an interview to the Daily Mail about the hoax; the story appeared in the paper on 4 March 1905 and was repeated in local newspapers. The St James's Gazette considered the events "a most audacious practical joke." The Mayor wanted the students involved to be sent down, but was persuaded by the Vice-Chancellor that this would damage his reputation further.

Dreadnoughts and the Royal Navy

In the early 20th century, Britain's naval fleet was seen as one of the foundations of its empire and a reflection of its power and wealth. As Britain was portrayed in books, plays, and popular culture as an island nation, the Royal Navy was seen as the defender of the island, and its first line of defence. A leading article in The Observer in 1909 described the supremacy of the Royal Navy as "the best security for the world's peace and advancement".

, the first of Britain's "dreadnought" class of battleship, entered into Royal Navy service in 1906. Dreadnought was the most technologically advanced ship built; it was better armed, faster, and stronger than any other vessel afloat. According to the historian Jan Rüger, from the time the ship was launched, it took on cultural significance as a symbol. It entered into public consciousness through songs and advertising. When the ship visited London in 1909—part of three fleet reviews held—a million people were estimated to have watched its arrival, and by 1910 it "had become a cultural icon with undeniable symbolic status". Rüger gives examples of advertising for Oxo stock cubes: "Drink OXO and dread nought"; a tailoring business that used the slogan "Dreadnought and wear British clothing"; and "Dreadnought trams" ran, styled as battleships, and complete with imitation guns. The cultural historian Elisa deCourcy describes the Dreadnought as having "a near sacrosanct nature" for the Edwardians.

In February 1910 the captain of Dreadnought was Herbert Richmond; Admiral Sir William May was the Commander-in-Chief, Home Fleet; as such, Dreadnought was his flagship. Also present on Dreadnought was Commander Willie Fisher—the Stephens' cousin—who was on the staff of the Admiral.

Hoax

In a talk given in 1940, Woolf described how, in 1910, young naval officers enjoyed playing practical jokes on one another:

This involved Cole and five friends—writer Virginia Stephen (later Virginia Woolf), her brother Adrian Stephen, Guy Ridley, Anthony Buxton, and artist Duncan Grant—who had themselves disguised by the theatrical costumier Willy Clarkson with skin darkeners and turbans to resemble members of the Abyssinian royal family. The main limitation of the disguises was that the "royals" could not eat anything, or their makeup would be ruined. Adrian Stephen took the role of "interpreter".

On 7 February 1910, Clarkson's employees visited Woolf's home and applied the stage makeup to Woolf, Grant, Buxton, and Ridley, then provided eastern robes. According to the Daily Mirror, they were also wearing £500 of jewellery; Martin Downer, in his biography of Cole, doubts the amount, which is not repeated by any of the participants.

A friend of Stephen's sent a telegram to the "C-in-C, Home Fleet" (Commander-in-chief of the vessels defending Britain)
stating that "Prince Makalen of Abbysinia  and suite arrive 4.20 today Weymouth. He wishes to see Dreadnought. Kindly arrange meet them on arrival"; the message was signed "Harding Foreign Office". Cole had found a post office staffed only by women, as he thought they were less likely to ask questions about the message. Cole, with his entourage, went to London's Paddington station where Cole claimed that he was "Herbert Cholmondeley" of the Foreign Office and demanded a special train to Weymouth; the stationmaster arranged a VIP coach.

In Weymouth, the navy welcomed the princes with an honour guard. An Abyssinian flag was not found, so the navy proceeded to use that of Zanzibar and to play Zanzibar's national anthem.

The group inspected the fleet. To show their appreciation, they communicated in a gibberish of words drawn from Latin and Greek; they asked for prayer mats and attempted to bestow fake military honours on some of the officers. Commander Fisher failed to recognise either of his cousins.

When the prank was uncovered in London, the ringleader Horace de Vere Cole contacted the press and sent a photo of the "princes" to the Daily Mirror. The group's pacifist views were considered a source of embarrassment, and the Royal Navy briefly became an object of ridicule. The navy later demanded that Cole be arrested. However, Cole and his compatriots had not broken any law. Instead, except for Virginia Woolf, they were subjected to a symbolic thrashing on the buttocks by junior Royal Navy officers.

Aftermath
According to press reports, during the visit to Dreadnought, the visitors repeatedly showed amazement or appreciation by exclaiming, "Bunga Bunga!" In 1915 during the First World War, HMS Dreadnought rammed and sank  a German submarine—the only battleship ever to do so. Among the telegrams of congratulation was one that read "BUNGA BUNGA".

A song was heard in music halls that year, sung to the tune of "The Girl I Left Behind"

Thirty years later, in 1940, Virginia Woolf gave talks about the Dreadnought hoax to the Rodmell Women's Institute and also to the Memoir Club, the latter attended by E. M. Forster.

Notes

References

Citations

Sources

Books

Journals

News articles

Websites
 

 
1910 in the United Kingdom
Hoaxes in the United Kingdom
February 1910 events
1910 in international relations
History of the Royal Navy
1910s hoaxes
1910 in England
Virginia Woolf